Jimmy Theo Patronis Jr. (born April 13, 1972) is an American politician serving as the chief financial officer of the state of Florida. He was previously a member of the Florida House of Representatives representing the 6th district, which includes Panama City and other parts of southern Bay County, from 2006 to 2014.

Early life and education
Patronis was born in Panama City, Florida on April 13, 1972. Patronis attended Gulf Coast Community College, where he graduated with his associate degree in restaurant management in 1994, and Florida State University, where he graduated with his bachelor degree in political science in 1996. While at Florida State University, Patronis worked as an intern in the Florida Senate and the House of Commons of the United Kingdom.

After graduation, in 1998, he was appointed by Governor Lawton Chiles to the Florida Elections Commission and again in 2001 by Governor Jeb Bush where he served until 2003. Patronis also served as chairman of the Bay County Airport Authority from 2004 to 2006.

Career

Florida House of Representatives
Due to term limits, Allan Bense, the speaker of the Florida House of Representatives, could not seek re-election in 2006. Patronis ran to succeed him in the 6th District, which included Gulf County, southern Bay County, and western Franklin County. Patronis won the Republican primary with 39% of the vote, defeating Lee Sullivan, Cameron Floyd Skinner, and Bill Fisher. In the general election, Patronis defeated Democratic nominee Janice Lucas with 67% of the vote. He was re-elected without opposition in 2008. In 2010, he defeated Democratic nominee John McDonald with 78% of the vote.

In 2012, following the reconfiguration of districts, Patronis remained in the 6th District, but it swapped its portions in Franklin County and Gulf County for a further incursion into Bay County. He was unopposed in both the primary and general elections, and thus was re-elected again unopposed. Patronis could not run for the Florida House again after 2012 due to term limits.

In 2015, Patronis was appointed to the Florida Public Service Commission by Governor Rick Scott for a four-year term.

Chief Financial Officer of Florida
On February 10, 2017, Florida's chief financial officer, Jeff Atwater, announced that he would resign in order to take the position of CFO for Florida Atlantic University. Governor Scott officially announced the appointment of Patronis on June 25, 2017. Patronis was officially sworn in to complete Atwater's term on June 30, 2017.

Patronis ran for his first full term in the 2018 CFO election. Patronis was unopposed in the Republican primary. The Democratic nominee was former state senator Jeremy Ring of Broward County. Though Patronis and Ring did not debate on stage, the race was noted for its acrimony, with much attention being drawn to Ring's resume at Yahoo! and Patronis' close ties with Governor Scott. Despite Ring going into election day with a 5-point lead in polling, Patronis defeated Ring, receiving 52% of the vote to Ring's 48%.

During the 2019 Legislative Session, Patronis worked to pass the firefighter cancer relief bill to provide protection and financial coverage to firefighters who are diagnosed with certain types of cancers.

Personal life 
Patronis and his family have run Captain Anderson's, a historic seafood restaurant in Panama City, for over 50 years. He is currently a partner in the business.

Patronis met his wife Katie in 1998 when her uncle, a family friend, introduced them at Captain Anderson's. They were married in 2006 and have two children. She currently works as a real estate agent in Panama City.

References

External links
Florida House of Representatives - Jimmy Patronis

1972 births
21st-century American politicians
American people of Greek descent
Chief Financial Officers of Florida
Florida State University alumni
Living people
Republican Party members of the Florida House of Representatives
People from Panama City, Florida